Odaikkarai is a small village located 10 km from Cheranmahadevi, in the Tirunelveli District of Tamil Nadu, India.  Odaikkarai has been in existence for over 125 years.

Odaikkarai has a population of about one thousand, ninety-nine percent of whom are Christian. The village has three churches: the CSI and CMS St. Matthew. The CSI church spire is very tall and it can be seen from remote villages. The church started in the year 1914 and centenary celebrations are planned for October, 2014. Odaikkarai has been well known for Christianity for many years.

The economy is largely agricultural and many people from Odaikkarai have migrated to major towns such as Madras, Bombay and Kovai, as well as to the Gulf. A few people are teaching and a substantial number of ladies are engaged in beedi rolling and farming activities. Three ponds are catering waters good for paddy fields.

Villages in Tirunelveli district